Eurema daira, the fairy yellow, barred yellow or barred sulphur, is a butterfly of the family Pieridae. The species was first described by Jean-Baptiste Godart in 1819. It is found from Argentina north to the southern United States. Strays can be found up to southern Arizona, South Dakota, southern Texas and even Washington, D.C.

The wingspan is 32–41 mm. Adults are on wing year round in the southern part of the range and in late summer and fall as vagrant.

The larvae feed on Fabaceae species, including Stylosanthes biflora and Aeschynomene species. Adults feed on the nectar of various flowers including joint vetches and shepherd's needle, and are the principal pollinators of Cnidoscolus urens.

Subspecies
E. d. daira (Virginia, New York, Virginia, Louisiana, Georgia, Florida)
E. d. palmira (Poey, [1852]) (West Indies, Cuba, Bahamas)
E. d. eugenia (Wallengren, 1860) (Mexico, Panama, Costa Rica, Guatemala)
E. d. sidonia (R. Felder, 1869) (Mexico)
E. d. lydia (C. Felder & R. Felder, 1861) (Venezuela, Colombia)
E. d. macheti Brévignon, 1996 (French Guiana)

References

External links

daira
Butterflies of North America
Butterflies of Central America
Butterflies of the Caribbean
Pieridae of South America
Butterflies described in 1819
Taxa named by Jean-Baptiste Godart